American singer and songwriter Lauren Alaina has released three studio albums, three extended plays, ten singles plus two as a featured artist, and eight music videos. Alaina rose to prominence in 2011 as the runner-up on the tenth season of American Idol. Her debut studio album, released in the fall of 2011, debuted in the top five of the Billboard 200. In 2017, Alaina became the only female to top both the Billboard Country Airplay chart (with her own single "Road Less Traveled") and Hot Country Songs chart (as featured on Kane Brown's "What Ifs").

Albums

Studio albums

Compilation albums

Extended plays

Singles

As lead artist

As featured artist

Promotional singles

Other charted songs

Music videos

Notes

References

External links
Official website
Lauren Alaina at AllMusic

Discographies of American artists
Country music discographies
American Idol discographies